Johnny Reid is a Canadian country music artist. His discography comprises ten studio albums and twenty-five singles. Reid has sold over 11 million albums worldwide.

Studio albums

1990s–2000s

2010s–2020s

Christmas albums

Extended plays

Singles

Other singles

Guest singles

Other charted songs

Music videos

References

Discographies of Canadian artists
Country music discographies